Keith Jebb is a contemporary English poet and critic. He attended St Catharine's College, Cambridge, and is the current Head Lecturer of Creative Writing at the University of Bedfordshire, Luton. He is also the author of A. E. Housman (Seren Press), a work commended by Harold Bloom in the introduction to his A. E. Housman.

His works
hide white space (Kater Murr's Press, 2006)
tonnes (Kater Murr's Press, 2008)

External links
A.E. Housman from Seren
 Notes on some contributors, including Keith Jebb

Living people
Year of birth missing (living people)
English male poets